Bělov is a municipality and village in Zlín District in the Zlín Region of the Czech Republic. It has about 300 inhabitants.

History
The first written mention of Bělov is in a deed of Bishop Jindřich Zdík from 1141.

References

Villages in Zlín District